The Davao squirrel (Sundasciurus davensis) is a species of rodent in the family Sciuridae. It is endemic to the Philippines.

References

Thorington, R. W. Jr. and R. S. Hoffman. 2005. Family Sciuridae. pp. 754–818 in Mammal Species of the World a Taxonomic and Geographic Reference. D. E. Wilson and D. M. Reeder eds. Johns Hopkins University Press, Baltimore.

Sundasciurus
Rodents of the Philippines
Mammals described in 1952
Endemic fauna of the Philippines
Fauna of Mindanao
Taxonomy articles created by Polbot
Taxa named by Colin Campbell Sanborn